Judge Booth may refer to:

Fenton Whitlock Booth (1869–1947), judge of the United States Court of Claims
James Booth (judge) (1914–2000), British circuit judge of Barrow-in-Furness
Margaret Booth (judge) (1933–2021), British judge of the High Court of Justice of England and Wales
Wilbur F. Booth (1861–1944), judge of the United States Court of Appeals for the Eighth Circuit

See also
Justice Booth (disambiguation)